Oenpelli Airport  is located in Gunbalanya (formerly known as Oenpelli), Northern Territory, Australia

References

Airports in the Northern Territory